Yponomeuta irrorella is a moth of the  family Yponomeutidae. It is found in most of Europe, except Ireland, Norway, Belgium, the Iberian Peninsula, Estonia and the western and southern part of the Balkan Peninsula.

The wingspan is 19–25 mm. Adults are on wing from July to August.

The larvae feed on Euonymus europaeus from within a silken web.

References

Moths described in 1796
Yponomeutidae
Moths of Europe
Moths of Asia